C.O.B.R.A. is the first single released from Marie-Mai's fourth album Miroir. It was released as digital download on 14 August 2012. The song was written by Fred St-Gelais and Marie-Mai. In an interview, Marie-Mai explained the song's inspiration: “C.O.B.R.A. is a rallying cry, an anthem to those who do not want to merge in the crowd, told Marie-Mai.  Fred (St-Gelais, director) and I, we wanted to write a song that would find all its meaning on stage, during a show, with a contagious rhythm...Let yourself get bewitched by the Cobra!”.

Music video
The video was filmed by director Jonathan Desbiens and produced by Patrick Chevrier and Outan Médias. The video premiered on 5 September 2012. The music video was filmed under the moonlight in the forest and in a mysterious building. The music video featured men and women running through the forest to get through the party held in the mysterious building. Marie-Mai can be seen engaged in a mesmerizing dance in the middle of the crowd and also on the stage. In the ending scene, Marie-Mai's eyes turns into a set of yellow reptilian eyes.

Chart performance
"C.O.B.R.A." debuted on the Canadian Hot 100 on 27 August 2012 at number 74.

References

2012 singles
Songs written by Fred St-Gelais
2009 songs
Musicor Records singles